Kingdon Gamaliel Porter (February 3, 1921 – December 3, 2012) was an American politician in the state of Tennessee. Porter served in the Tennessee State Senate as a Democrat. Serving from 1961 to 1962, he represented parts of  Dyer, Crockett, and Lauderdale Counties. He previously served in the Tennessee House of Representatives. He was a farmer. He died in Humboldt, Tennessee in 2012.

References

2012 deaths
1921 births
Democratic Party Tennessee state senators
Democratic Party members of the Tennessee House of Representatives